Rosedale railway station is located on the Gippsland line in Victoria, Australia. It serves the town of Rosedale, and it opened on 1 June 1877.

History

Rosedale opened on 1 June 1877, when the line was extended from Morwell to Sale. The station, like the township itself, was named after the wife of the leaseholder of Snakes Ridge, a pastoral run which was taken up in 1842 and was located to the north and south of present day Rosedale. 

In June 1987, Rosedale was abolished as an electric staff station, and was replaced with the electric staff section Traralgon – Sale.

Platforms and services

Rosedale has one platform. It is serviced by V/Line Bairnsdale line services.

Platform 1:
 services to Bairnsdale and Southern Cross

References

External links
Victorian Railway Stations Gallery
Melway map

Railway stations in Australia opened in 1877
Regional railway stations in Victoria (Australia)
Victorian Heritage Register
Transport in Gippsland (region)
Shire of Wellington
Listed railway stations in Australia